National Secondary Route 214, or just Route 214 (or ) is a National Road Route of Costa Rica, located in the San José province.

Description
In San José province the route covers San José canton (Hospital, San Sebastián districts), Desamparados canton (San Rafael Arriba, San Rafael Abajo districts).

References

Highways in Costa Rica